Bitterley  is a civil parish in Shropshire, England.  It contains 42 listed buildings that are recorded in the National Heritage List for England.  Of these, one is listed at Grade I, the highest of the three grades, ten are at Grade II*, the middle grade, and the others are at Grade II, the lowest grade.  The parish contains the villages of Bitterley, Cleeton St Mary, and Middleton and smaller settlements, and is otherwise entirely rural.  Most of the listed buildings are houses, farmhouses and farm buildings, many dating from the 15th–17th centuries, the majority of them originally timber framed.  The other listed buildings include two churches, a churchyard cross, a former manor house, a country house with associated structures, a milestone, two bridges, a lychgate, and a telephone kiosk.


Key

Buildings

References

Citations

Sources

Lists of buildings and structures in Shropshire